The Meikleour Beech Hedge(s) (European Beech = Fagus sylvatica), located near Meikleour, Perth and Kinross, Scotland, was planted in the autumn of 1745 by Jean Mercer and her husband, Robert Murray Nairne on the Marquess of Lansdowne's Meikleour estate. It is said the hedge grows towards the heavens because the men who planted it were killed at the Battle of Culloden. The hedge lies alongside the A93 Perth-Blairgowrie Road, and can be viewed by visitors all year round.

It is usually trimmed once every ten years, although the most recent trim, which took place in late 2019, was the first in almost 20 years.

See also 
 Hedge
 Topiary

References

External links
Meikleour Beech Hedge at VisitScotland.com

Tourist attractions in Perth and Kinross
Flora of Scotland
Fagus